Easy Rider: The Ride Back is a 2012 drama film and a prequel to the 1969 film Easy Rider. Although none of the cast or production team of the original film were involved in its production, the director Dustin Rikert did secure the legal rights to the name. The film focuses on the history of Wyatt Williams' family and takes an unusually conservative point of view compared to the countercultural tone of the original.

Reception

Critical reception
Leonard Maltin has called the film a bomb and has described the film as a "staggeringly bad attempt to cash in on the iconic original" and that it is "poor on all accounts."

References

External links
 
 

2012 films
American drama films
2012 drama films
2010s English-language films
2010s American films